

Eadnoth (or Ednoth) was a medieval Bishop of Crediton.

Eadnoth was elected to Crediton between 1011 and 1015. He died between 1019 and 1027.

Citations

References

External links
 

Bishops of Crediton (ancient)
11th-century English Roman Catholic bishops
11th-century deaths
Year of birth unknown

Year of death uncertain